Ian Raphael Bishop (born 24 October 1967) is a Trinidadian cricket commentator and former cricketer who represented the West Indies cricket team between 1988 and 1998 in Tests and One Day Internationals. He played as a right arm fast bowler.

International career
He reached 100 test wickets in only 21 Test matches. A powerful fast bowler with a talent for outswing and was among the fastest bowlers in the world before  severe back injuries cut him down in 1991. He rehabilitated and made adjustments to his bowling action, returning strongly late in 1992. However, in 1993, he was struck by injuries again, not returning until mid 1995. Thus, what had been at one stage a highly promising career was substantially curtailed.

International commentary
He now tours the world as a commentator. Like several other past players for the West Indies, he is quite vocal about the languishing state of his former team.

Bishop also commentated for Cricket on Five for the highlights of the 2007 England Tests and the One Day International series between the West Indies cricket team and the Indian cricket team.

Bishop's commentary of the 2016 T20 World Cup Final was especially memorable when after Carlos Brathwaite won the match with 4 consecutive sixes, Bishop said "Carlos Brathwaite! Carlos Brathwaite! Remember the name!" This has been looked back on as a "classic call" and an "iconic piece of commentary"

Between stints commentating on cricket, Bishop completed an MBA.

Personal life
Bishop is a devout Christian. He's also a fan of English football team Manchester United and loves the NBA.

References

External links

Profile on Howstat!

West Indies One Day International cricketers
West Indies Test cricketers
Derbyshire cricketers
Trinidad and Tobago cricketers
West Indian cricket commentators
1967 births
Living people
Alumni of the University of Leicester
Marylebone Cricket Club cricketers